Anue is a town and municipality located in the province and autonomous community of Navarre, northern Spain.

References

External links
 ANUE in the Bernardo Estornés Lasa - Auñamendi Encyclopedia (Euskomedia Fundazioa) 

Municipalities in Navarre